In mathematics, specifically in the theory of generalized functions, the limit of a sequence of distributions is the distribution that sequence approaches. The distance, suitably quantified, to the limiting distribution can be made arbitrarily small by selecting a distribution sufficiently far along the sequence. This notion generalizes a limit of a sequence of functions; a limit as a distribution may exist when a limit of functions does not.

The notion is a part of distributional calculus, a generalized form of calculus that is based on the notion of distributions, as opposed to classical calculus, which is based on the narrower concept of functions.

Definition 
Given a sequence of distributions , its limit  is the distribution given by 

for each test function , provided that distribution exists. The existence of the limit  means that (1) for each , the limit of the sequence of numbers  exists and that (2) the linear functional  defined by the above formula is continuous with respect to the topology on the space of test functions.

More generally, as with functions, one can also consider a limit of a family of distributions.

Examples 
A distributional limit may still exist when the classical limit does not. Consider, for example, the function:

Since, by integration by parts,

we have: .

The distribution  is defined similarly.

One has

Let  be the rectangle with positive orientation, with an integer N. By the residue formula,

On the other hand,

Oscillatory integral

See also 
Distribution (number theory)

References 
Demailly, Complex Analytic and Differential Geometry

Generalized functions
Schwartz distributions